The Everglades Foundation was formed by a group of outdoor enthusiasts, environmentalists and residents of Florida who were concerned over the decline of the Everglades and the resulting damage in the nearby natural and protected areas such as Florida Bay. The original founding members, the late George Barley, a wealthy Orlando developer, and billionaire  Paul Tudor Jones II, spearheaded the organization's growth, and shared the same concern over the steady decline of the environmental balance in this unique and delicate ecosystem due to poor water management and pollution.

The Foundation was created and founded in 1993, and is currently operated as a not-for-profit 501(c)(3) charitable organization. This organization is supported by noteworthy performers, professional athletes, and business persons, including Jimmy Buffett and golfer Jack Nicklaus.

Focus
The Everglades Foundation is dedicated to restoring and protecting America's Everglades through science, advocacy, and education, thereby advancing an understanding of the Greater Everglades ecosystem and its irreplaceable environmental and economic value. The organization is funded primarily from private donations. The Foundation’s Board covers administrative and fundraising expenses separately each year. This allows the Foundation to state that 100 percent of each donation goes directly to support programs to restore the Everglades.  Donations provide scientists, policy analysts, researchers, communications experts and other professionals with funding to address complex issues involved in saving the River of Grass. The Everglades Foundation directs some of its resources toward organizations that hold congruent philosophies on Everglades restoration. Foundation-supported grant programs allow collaboration instead of competition with several non-profit organizations to focus efforts instead of working individually on like-minded environmental concerns.

The organization employs Ph.D-level scientists who work to promote the understanding of the greater Everglades ecosystem. The Foundation provides its expertise and research to partner organizations in addition to grant funding.  This is one of the strengths of the organization, and as such, The Everglades Foundation is often called on to provide expertise on policy issues impacting the Everglades with local governments such as Miami-Dade County, Florida, as well as the federal Comprehensive Everglades Restoration Plan (CERP) project.

Key personnel
Carlos de la Cruz Jr. - Chairman
Eric Eikenberg - CEO

Fundraising
The Everglades Foundation holds annual benefits known as the ForEverglades Benefit in Palm Beach, Florida, in February, and the ForEverglades Naples Benefit in Naples, Florida, in March, to increase awareness and funding to support scientific research and other programs related to Everglades restoration. The Everglades Foundation also dedicates funds for legal action to ensure the protection of the Everglades if needed.

References

Environmental organizations based in Florida
Water organizations in the United States
1993 establishments in Florida
Organizations established in 1993